The Colonel is a 1918 Hungarian film directed by Michael Curtiz. It featured Bela Lugosi in his last Hungarian film, just before he emigrated to Germany.

The script by Richard Falk is based on the play by Ferenc Herczeg. The film was first released on 30 December 1918 at the Omnia Theater in Budapest.

Plot
The Colonel (a professional thief) is caught burgling a millionaire's home. Rather than be arrested, the Colonel agrees to perform a service for the millionaire in exchange for his freedom. He is told that he must perform another robbery, this time stealing something from the millionaire's brother. Meanwhile, the Colonel falls in love with the rich man's daughter.

Cast
 Bela Lugosi as The Colonel (a thief)
 László Z. Molnár
 Charles Puffy (credited as Karoly Huszar)
 Sándor Góth
 Géza Boross
 Janka Csatay
 Cläre Lotto
 Zoltán Szerémy as Houston
 Árpád id. Latabár
 Gerő Mály

See also
 Michael Curtiz filmography
 Bela Lugosi filmography

References

External links

1918 films
Lost Hungarian films
Hungarian silent films
Hungarian black-and-white films
Hungarian films based on plays
Films based on works by Ferenc Herczeg
Films directed by Michael Curtiz
Austro-Hungarian films